Balagushevo (Balağuş) is a rural locality (a selo) in Yengalyshevsky Selsoviet, Chishminsky District, Bashkortostan, Russia. The population was 241 as of 2010. There are 5 streets.

Geography 
Balagushevo is located 48 km southeast of Chishmy (the district's administrative centre) by road. Semyonovka is the nearest rural locality.

References 

Rural localities in Chishminsky District